Kalabaland Dhura is a mountain of the Garhwal Himalaya in Uttarakhand India. It situated at the head of Kalabaland Glacier. It is 158th highest located entirely within the Uttrakhand. Nanda Devi, is the highest mountain in this category. It lies 3 km south of Kalganga Dhura . Its nearest higher neighbor Bamba Dhura  lies 2.7 km ENE and it is 3.7 km west of Chiring We . It lies 6.9 km NW of Suli Top .

Climbing history
The first ascent of Kalabaland Dhura happened on 6 June, 1979 by Harish Kapadia, Vijay Kothari and Lakhpa Tsering. They taken the route from Camp 3 to a col on the north side of the peak. Then followed a steep gully to the top which had heavy cornices on the top. Kalabaland Dhura is a suggested name for this unnamed peak at that time.

A team from I.I.T Bombay led by V. V. Limaye climbed Kalabaland Dhura in 1982.

Neighboring and subsidiary peaks
Neighboring peaks of Kalabaland Dhura:
 Bamba Dhura, 6,334m (20,781 ft),  
 Suli Top, 6,300m (20,669 ft), 
 Kalganga Dhura, 6,215m (20,390 ft)
 Chiring We, 6,559m (20,030 ft)
 Suitilla, 6,373m (20,909 ft)

Glaciers and rivers
Kalabaland Glacier is 15 km in length, running NW to SE. It joins the Yankchar glacier and both together form the Shankalpa glacier, The Ralam Gad river originates from here which later joins Gori Ganga or Gori gad which originates at Milam Glacier on the west of Kalabaland glacier.

See also

 List of Himalayan peaks of Uttarakhand

References

Mountains of Uttarakhand
Six-thousanders of the Himalayas
Geography of Chamoli district